Hobart is an American literary magazine that publishes fiction, poetry, interviews, and essays. Founded as an online magazine in 2001, Hobart grew into a biannual print magazine in 2003. The founding editor was Aaron Burch. Past issues have been dedicated to topics such as luck, the outdoors, and games. In addition to print and web content, in 2006 Hobart added a book division (Short Flight/Long Drive Books), with Elizabeth Ellen as editor. In October 2022, Burch and most of the editors resigned after Ellen published a interview with writer Alex Perez who criticized elitism, "wokeness" and other issues in the literary world.

Several pieces appearing in Hobart have received awards or were selected for anthologies: recent selections include Roxane Gay's story “North Country” and Mike Meginnis' “Navigators” that were selected for The Best American Short Stories 2012 . 


Short Flight/Long Drive Books

Short Flight/Long Drive Books is an independent, non-profit small press specializing in the publication of fiction. A division of Hobart, Short Flight/Long Drive Book was founded in 2006 with Elizabeth Ellen as editor.

Noted publications

References

External links
 

2001 establishments in California
Biannual magazines published in the United States
English-language magazines
Magazines established in 2001
Magazines published in California
Mass media in Thousand Oaks, California
Online literary magazines published in the United States